Ring of Time, also known as The Ring of Time, is an outdoor bronze sculpture by Hilda Grossman Morris, located at the entrance to the Standard Plaza in Portland, Oregon. The allegorical sculpture was created during 1965–1967 and is owned by the Standard Insurance Company.

Description and history

Ring of Time is a monumental bronze sculpture installed in the outer foyer of the Standard Plaza on Southwest 6th between Madison and Main in Downtown Portland's Transit Mall. It was designed by Hilda Grossman Morris and created during 1965–1967. Portland Tribune has described the sculpture as "rough" and "primitive", as well as "chunky, clunky, big and funky".

Reception
Emporis has referred to Ring of Time as one of the city's "most admired" sculptures.

See also
 1967 in art

References

1967 establishments in Oregon
1967 sculptures
Allegorical sculptures in Oregon
Bronze sculptures in Oregon
Outdoor sculptures in Portland, Oregon
Southwest Portland, Oregon